The Ontario Cup is a soccer tournament for clubs based in the province of Ontario in Canada. It began play in 1901 under the Ontario Football Association League, now known as the Ontario Soccer Association, and is the oldest association football competition in North America.

History
The cup was first played as a senior men's tournament in 1901, making it one of the oldest active sporting competitions in Canada. It has been held every year since, with the exception of the World Wars.

By 2004, the cup featured at least 12,000 athletes, and by 2008 it featured over 600 teams across 22 different age levels. The final is played at the Ontario Soccer Centre in Vaughan, Ontario.

Format
The competition is played from May to September every year to crown a champion in each of 22 divisions, including different age levels for boys, girls and adults, and a Special Olympics division. The Ontario Cup winners from the under-14, under-16, under-18 and senior open divisions advance to the Canadian National Challenge Cup to compete against the cup winners from other provinces in Canada.

Champions

 1901 Galt FC
 1902 Galt FC
 1903 Galt FC
 1904 Toronto Scots
 1905 Seaforth Hurons
 1906 Toronto Thistle FC
 1907 Toronto Thistle FC
 1908 Little York
 1909 Toronto Thistle FC
 1910 Toronto Thistle FC
 1910 Galt FC
 1911 Hamilton Westinghouse FC
 1912 Hamilton Westinghouse FC
 1913 Hamilton Lancashire
 1914 Toronto Eaton's
 1915 Toronto Lancashire
 1916 Hamilton Westinghouse FC & Toronto Eaton's
 1918 Toronto Scottish FC
 1919 Toronto Old Country
 1920 Hamilton Westinghouse FC
 1921 Toronto Scottish FC
 1922 Toronto Scottish FC
 1923 Guelph Taylor-Forbes
 1924 Brantford Cockshutt FC Blues
 1925 Hamilton Westinghouse FC
 1926 Toronto Willys-Overland
 1927 Toronto Ulster United
 1928 Toronto Scottish FC
 1929 Toronto Ulster United FC
 1930 Hamilton Thistle FC
 1931 Toronto Scottish FC
 1932 Falconbridge Falcons
 1933 Falconbridge Falcons
 1934 Falconbridge Falcons
 1935 Toronto British Consols

 1936 Toronto British Consols
 1937 Toronto Ulster United FC
 1938 Timmins Dome Mines
 1939 Hamilton City
 1940 Toronto England United
 1956 Toronto Thistle FC
 1957 Windsor Corinthians
 1958 Sudbury United FC
 1959 Hamilton City
 1960 SC Golden Mile Toronto
 1961 Windsor Caboto
 1962 Toronto Royals FC
 1963 Scarborough Thistle
 1964 Sudbury Italia FC
 1965 Oshawa Italia FC
 1966 Oshawa Thistle
 1967 Toronto Ballymena United
 1968 Toronto Royals FC
 1969 Sudbury White Eagles
 1970 Hamilton Italo-Canadian SC
 1971 Windsor Maple Leafs
 1972 Toronto San Fili
 1973 Toronto West Indies United
 1974 Windsor SS Italia
 1975 Brantford Falcons
 1976 Windsor Croatia SC
 1977 Toronto Emerald
 1978 London Italia Marconi
 1979 Toronto Termitana
 1980 North York Ciociaro SC
 1981 Kitchener-Waterloo Olympics
 1982 Hamilton Serbians SC
 1983 Windsor Croatia SC
 1984 Hamilton Dundas United
 1985 Toronto Emerald

 1986 Hamilton Steelers
 1987 Scarborough Azzurri SC
 1988 Toronto SC Braga Arsenal
 1989 Scarborough Azzurri
 1990 Windsor Giovanni Caboto Sting
 1991 Scarborough Azzurri
 1992 Scarborough Ulster Thistle
 1993 Woodbridge Sora Lazio
 1994 Scarborough Azzurri
 1995 Windsor Croatia
 1996 Scarborough Azzurri
 1997 Hamilton Dundas United
 1998 Hamilton Serbians
 1999 Woodbridge Sora Lazio Strikers
 2000 Woodbridge Azzurri
 2001 Aurora SC Hearts
 2002 London Portuguese
 2003 Kanata Soccer Post
 2004 Ottawa Royals
 2005 Scarborough GS United
 2006 Ottawa St. Anthony SC
 2007 Woodbridge Italia
 2008 Real Toronto FC
 2009 Real Toronto FC
 2010 AEK London FC
 2011 Toronto Celtic
 2012 AEK London FC
 2013 Ottawa Gloucester Celtic
 2014 London Marconi
 2015 London Marconi
 2016 Ottawa Gloucester Celtic
 2017 Durham FC Celtic
 2018 Caledon SC
 2019 Ottawa St. Anthony
 2021 Gloucester Celtic

Challenge Cup Ontario Section Winners

 1947 Toronto Ulster United FC
 1948 Toronto Greenbacks
 1949 Hamilton Westinghouse FC

 1950 Toronto Mahers
 1951 Toronto Ulster United FC
 1952 Toronto Italo-Canadians

 1954 Hamilton British Imperials
 1955 Toronto Ulster United FC
 1959 Hamilton Italo-Canadian SC

References

External links
 Official site
List of winners (1901–2012) by Peter Sokolowski on RSSSF.com

Canadian National Challenge Cup
Soccer in Ontario
Soccer cup competitions in Canada
1901 establishments in Ontario
Recurring sporting events established in 1901